The Shooting Party is a 1984 British drama film directed by Alan Bridges and based on the book of the same name by Isabel Colegate. The film is set in 1913, less than a year before the beginning of the First World War, and shows the soon-to-vanish way of life of English aristocrats, focusing on a shooting party gathered to pursue pheasant and general self-indulgence. Their situation is contrasted with the life of local rural poor, who work on the estate and serve as beaters, driving the game for the aristocrats to shoot. It was entered into the 14th Moscow International Film Festival.

Plot summary
In the autumn of 1913, a large party of guests gather at the estate of Sir Randolph Nettleby (James Mason) and his wife Minnie (Dorothy Tutin) for a weekend of shooting. Over the next few days two of the guests, Lord Gilbert Hartlip (Edward Fox) and Lionel Stephens (Rupert Frazer), engage in an escalating contest over who can shoot the more game. Hartlip is a renowned sportsman threatened by Stephens's skill, while Stephens is anxious to impress his sweetheart, the married Olivia (Judi Bowker). Hartlip's wife, Aline (Cheryl Campbell) is carrying on an indiscreet love affair with another guest, Sir Reuben Hergesheimer (Aharon Ipalé). Meanwhile, the Nettlebys' granddaughter Cicely (Rebecca Saire) is allowing herself to be courted by a Hungarian count (Joris Stuyck), much to the chagrin of her mother Ida (Sara Badel).

All of the characters' personal tensions reach their breaking-point when one of the party is killed accidentally on the final day of shooting, leading the guests to reconsider their relationships. In the closing scene, credits reveal the members of the shooting party who would later be killed in the First World War.

Cast
James Mason as Sir Randolph Nettleby
Edward Fox as Lord Gilbert Hartlip
Dorothy Tutin as Lady Minnie Nettleby
John Gielgud as Cornelius Cardew
Gordon Jackson as Tom Harker
Cheryl Campbell as Lady Aline Hartlip
Robert Hardy as Bob, Lord Lilburn
Aharon Ipalé as Sir Reuben Hergesheimer
Joris Stuyck as Count Tibor Rakassyi
Rebecca Saire as Cicely Nettleby
Sarah Badel as Ida Nettleby
Rupert Frazer as Lionel Stephens
Judi Bowker as Lady Lilburn, Olivia
Warren Saire as Marcus Nettleby
John J. Carney as Jarvis
Ann Castle as Lady Mildred Stamp
Daniel Chatto as John
 Mia Fothergill as Violet
Thomas Heathcote as Ogden
Barry Jackson as Weir
 Jonathon Lacey as Dan Glass
Richard Leech as Dr. West
Jack May as Sir Harry Stamp
 Deborah Miles as Ellen
 Daniel Moynihan as Maidment
Patrick O'Connell as Charlie Lyne
 Nicholas Pietrek as Osbert
Lockwood West as Rogers
Frank Windsor as Glass

Analysis
There is a general feeling of the end of a way of life, as the characters go about their lives unaware of the coming war (World War I) and the changes it will bring.

Released posthumously, this is the last film appearance by James Mason, who plays Sir Randolph Nettleby, the local landowner who has something of the old values. Edward Fox as Lord Gilbert Hartlip represents the newer types who don't have the same solid beliefs: He gets into a competition over who is the best shot, despite his host's disapproval.

Production
According to the DVD extras documentary, Paul Scofield was cast as Sir Randolph Nettleby, but he was seriously injured during the first shot on the first day of shooting. Because the film takes place in October, during partridge-shooting season, the filmmakers had to make a choice, either to delay filming for a year, or to re-cast. James Mason was just finishing filming Doctor Fischer of Geneva for the BBC, and the schedule was changed to allow him to take over the part of Nettleby, six weeks later.

The film was shot at Knebworth House in Hertfordshire.

Reception
Critic Pauline Kael gave the film a positive review and wrote "Bridges has a special gift for these evocations of a world seen in a bell jar, and now, with Geoffrey Reeve as producer and Fred Tammes as cinematographer, he has refined his techniques."

In September 1985, Roger Ebert gave the film three stars and concluded his review: “This is the sort of small, intelligent and civilized film that we have to find in Europe, because American actors of the same caliber would not want to appear in small roles with so many of their equals. The movie is a reminder that American films are usually about one or two stars and a handful of well-known character actors, while Europeans are still capable of pitching in together for an ensemble piece. There is nothing new in the message of this film, but a great deal of artistry in its telling.”

As of August 2021, the film holds a 100% fresh rating on the Rotten Tomatoes website, based on five reviews.

References

External links

1984 films
1984 drama films
British drama films
Films directed by Alan Bridges
Films scored by John Scott (composer)
Films set in 1913
Films set in Norfolk
Films set in country houses
Films about hunters
1980s English-language films
1980s British films